FK Sobrance -Sobranecko is a Slovak association football club located in Sobrance. It currently plays in 3. Liga (East).

Colors and badge 
Its colors are yellow and blue.

Current squad
As of 24 August 2022

References

External links
Futbalnet profile 
Facebook page 

Football clubs in Slovakia
Association football clubs established in 1911
1911 establishments in Slovakia